Reynel Frances T. Hugnatan (born November 3, 1978) is a Filipino professional basketball player for the Meralco Bolts of the Philippine Basketball Association. He was picked 9th overall by the Coca-Cola Tigers in the 2003 PBA draft.

PBA career statistics

As of the end of 2021 season

Season-by-season averages

|-
| align=left | 
| align=left | Coca-Cola
| 58 || 14.1 || .448 || – || .680 || 3.1 || .8 || .2 || .1 || 3.7
|-
| align=left rowspan=2| 
| align=left | Coca-Cola
| rowspan=2|72 || rowspan=2|27.4 || rowspan=2|.489 || rowspan=2|.143 || rowspan=2|.697 || rowspan=2|6.2 || rowspan=2|1.5 || rowspan=2|.5 || rowspan=2|.2 || rowspan=2|8.6 
|-
| align=left | Alaska
|-
| align=left | 
| align=left | Alaska
| 48 || 24.1 || .500 || .000 || .650 || 5.5 || 1.0 || .4 || .2 || 6.9
|-
| align=left | 
| align=left | Alaska
| 35 || 19.9 || .531 || .000 || .641 || 4.9 || .8 || .2 || .1 || 7.5
|-
| align=left | 
| align=left | Alaska
| 46 || 24.8 || .451 || .333 || .695 || 6.0 || 1.3 || .4 || .2 || 8.8
|-
| align=left | 
| align=left | Alaska
| 44 || 22.6 || .500 || .250 || .689 || 6.0 || 1.2 || .3 || .1 || 8.2
|-
| align=left | 
| align=left | Alaska
| 62 || 20.0 || .466 || .000 || .721 || 5.1 || 1.3 || .2 || .1 || 7.7 
|-
| align=left | 
| align=left | Alaska
| 27 || 20.6 || .453 || – || .627 || 5.9 || 1.0 || .2 || .1 || 6.1
|-
| align=left | 
| align=left | Meralco
| 35 || 22.3 || .509 || .000 || .769 || 5.5 || .8 || .3 || .3 || 6.1
|-
| align=left | 
| align=left | Meralco
| 47 || 27.3 || .465 || .000 || .789 || 6.5 || 1.2 || .4 || .4 || 9.5
|-
| align=left | 
| align=left | Meralco
| 35 || 31.5 || .439 || .286 || .647 || 7.1 || 1.4 || .5 || .2 || 8.7
|-
| align=left | 
| align=left | Meralco
| 38 || 24.0 || .429 || .333 || .843 || 4.4 || .8 || .2 || .2 || 7.7
|-
| align=left | 
| align=left | Meralco
| 50 || 21.2 || .445 || .397 || .831 || 3.9 || 1.2 || .3 || .1 || 8.6
|-
| align=left | 
| align=left | Meralco
| 48 || 20.0 || .391 || .357 || .842 || 3.4 || 1.2 || .3 || .3 || 8.5
|-
| align=left | 
| align=left | Meralco
| 40 || 18.3 || .397 || .293 || .729 || 3.2 || 1.6 || .4 || .2 || 6.8
|-
| align=left | 
| align=left | Meralco
| 34 || 12.1 || .321 || .190 || .862 || 2.7 || .6 || .1 || .2 || 3.6
|-
| align=left | 
| align=left | Meralco
| 16 || 28.2 || .427 || .350 || .794 || 4.8 || 2.3 || .4 || .3 || 11.7
|-
| align=left | 
| align=left | Meralco
| 29 || 16.5 || .404 || .253 || .694 || 2.8 || .8 || .2 || .1 || 7.1
|-class=sortbottom
| align=center colspan=2 | Career
| 764 || 21.9 || .451 || .304 || .719 || 4.9 || 1.2 || .3 || .2 || 7.5

References

External links

1978 births
Living people
Alaska Aces (PBA) players
Basketball players from Negros Occidental
Centers (basketball)
UM Hawks basketball players
Filipino men's basketball players
Meralco Bolts players
Philippine Basketball Association All-Stars
Power forwards (basketball)
Powerade Tigers players
Sportspeople from Bacolod
Powerade Tigers draft picks